This is a list of dignitaries at the state funeral of Nelson Mandela on Sunday, 15 December 2013, at Mandela's rural home village of Qunu in the Eastern Cape.

Dignitaries

Heads of state and government

Government representatives

International organizations

Former leaders

Eminent persons

: The ROC Ministry of Foreign Affairs decided not to send a delegation because of the time constraint. Instead, Foreign Minister David Lin personally visited the Liaison Office of South Africa to convey condolences over the death of Mandela. In addition, the Representative of the ROC to South Africa visited the Union Buildings in Pretoria to view the remains of Mandela and pay respects on behalf of the ROC government.

References

External links
 

Funeral 
Mandela
Mandela